Carabelli is a surname of Italian origin. Notable people with this surname include:

 Adolfo Leandro Carabelli (1893-1947), Argentine piano player, composer and bandleader
 Carmela Negri Carabelli (1910-1978), Italian mystic and spiritual daughter of Saint Pio of Pietrelcina 
 Francesco Carabelli, Italian sculptor of the 18th century 
 Georg Carabelli, Edler von Lunkaszprie (1787–1842), Hungarian dentist and professor 
 Gianni Carabelli (born 1979), Italian athlete 
 Horacio Carabelli (born 1968), Uruguay-born Brazilian sailor and engineer

Italian-language surnames